DBHS may refer to:
 Daniel Boone Area High School, Birdsboro, Pennsylvania, United States
 Daniel Boone High School (Tennessee), Gray, Tennessee, United States
 David Brearley High School, Kenilworth, New Jersey, United States
 Deerfield Beach High School, Deerfield Beach, Florida, United States
 Diamond Bar High School, Diamond Bar, California, United States
 Dobyns-Bennett High School, Kingsport, Tennessee, United States
 Don Bosco High School, Lagawe, Ifugao, Philippines
 Drummoyne Boys' High School, Sydney, New South Wales, Australia